Ushishir (Japanese: 宇志知島; Ushishiru-tō; Ainu: ウシシㇼ, lit. "Land of the bay") is a collective name for two uninhabited volcanic islands and several reefs, all being parts of an eponymous partially submerged volcano, located in the centre of the Kuril Islands chain in the Sea of Okhotsk in the northwest Pacific Ocean. Its name is derived from the Ainu language for "hot spring".

Geology

These islets are the tops of a partially submerged volcano. Two small lava domes form small islands in the central lagoon, and numerous fumaroles and hot springs are along the southeast caldera shoreline.
The northern islet (Ryponkicha ) is the smaller of the two, and consists of a portion of the volcano's flank, with sheer cliffs rising up  from the sea. 
Ushishir is still an active volcano with the last known eruption in 1884.

Fauna

In the spring and summer some of the largest colonies of crested and whiskered auklet in the Kuril Islands are found on the island; least auklet also nest here.

History

Ushishir had no permanent habitation prior to European contact, but was visited in summer by the Ainu tribes from Rasshua, who regarded the island as a sacred land, which they identified as the home of the thunder god. Remains of Ainu huts have been found on the northern slopes of Yankicha's crater bay. Claimed by the Empire of Russia, sovereignty over Ushishir was passed to the Empire of Japan per the Treaty of Saint Petersburg along with the rest of the Kuril Islands. Approaches to the island are difficult due to frequent fogs, rapid ocean currents and the presence of numerous small offshore rocks. The island was formerly administered as part of Shimushiro District of Nemuro Subprefecture of Hokkaidō. After World War II, the island came under the control of the Soviet Union, and is now administered as part of the Sakhalin Oblast of the Russian Federation.

See also
List of volcanoes in Russia

References

External links
 Sakhalin Oblast

Notes

Further reading 
 Gorshkov, G. S. Volcanism and the Upper Mantle Investigations in the Kurile Island Arc. Monographs in geoscience. New York: Plenum Press, 1970. 
 Krasheninnikov, Stepan Petrovich, and James Greive. The History of Kamtschatka and the Kurilski Islands, with the Countries Adjacent. Chicago: Quadrangle Books, 1963. 
 Rees, David. The Soviet Seizure of the Kuriles. New York: Praeger, 1985.  
 Takahashi, Hideki, and Masahiro Ōhara. Biodiversity and Biogeography of the Kuril Islands and Sakhalin. Bulletin of the Hokkaido University Museum, no. 2-. Sapporo, Japan: Hokkaido University Museum, 2004.

Active volcanoes
Calderas of Russia
Islands of the Sea of Okhotsk
Islands of the Russian Far East
Islands of the Kuril Islands
Uninhabited islands of Russia
Uninhabited islands of the Pacific Ocean
Volcanoes of the Kuril Islands
Holocene calderas